The Carpathian Trophy is an annual men's friendly handball tournament organised by the Romanian Handball Federation. The first edition took place in Bucharest in 1959.

Tournament structure 
It reached the 44th edition in December 2022. There is no precise format for the tournament, even though recently there were four participating teams.

Editions 
 
 Some editions were initially planned but cancelled due to schedule.

Summary

See also
 Carpathian Trophy (women's handball)

References

External links
  Romanian Handball Federation official website

International handball competitions hosted by Romania
Recurring sporting events established in 1959
1959 establishments in Romania